Speed Hall, on the campus of Union College in Barbourville, Kentucky, was built during 1903–05.  It was listed on the National Register of Historic Places in 1982.

It is Union College's oldest building.  It served originally as the women's dormitory, until Pfeiffer Hall was opened in 1943.  It was later used by the music department, by the home economics department, and for administration.

It is named for benefactor Fanny Henning Speed, of Louisville, Kentucky, who was the wife of Joshua Speed, a close friend of Abraham Lincoln.  Her connection to Union College was through Dr. Daniel Stevenson, pastor of Trinity Methodist Episcopal Church in Louisville before he became president of Union College in 1886.  She left half of her estate, $500,000, to the college, allowing it to embark on a major building program.

See also 
 Old Classroom Building (1907)
 Soldiers and Sailors Memorial Gym (1919)

References

University and college dormitories in the United States
National Register of Historic Places in Knox County, Kentucky
School buildings completed in 1905
Union College (Kentucky)
1905 establishments in Kentucky
University and college buildings on the National Register of Historic Places in Kentucky